Yennora railway station is located on the Main South line, serving the Sydney suburb of Yennora. It is served by Sydney Trains T2 Inner West & Leppington and T5 Cumberland line services.

History
Yennora station opened on 6 November 1927 as a private siding for a Mrs McCreadie.

Platforms & services

Transport links
Yennora station is served by one NightRide route:
N60: Fairfield station to Town Hall station

References

External links

Yennora station details Transport for New South Wales

Railway stations in Sydney
Railway stations in Australia opened in 1927
Main Southern railway line, New South Wales
City of Fairfield
Cumberland Council, New South Wales